The lac Chézine (English: Chézine Lake) is a freshwater body in the head area of the Chézine River, in the unorganized territory of Lac-Croche, in the La Jacques-Cartier Regional County Municipality, in the administrative region of Capitale-Nationale, in the province of Quebec, in Canada. Lac Chézine is located at the boundary of the southwestern part of the Jacques-Cartier National Park which is included in the Laurentides Wildlife Reserve.

The east side of Lake Chézine is served by the forest road R0300 (north–south direction).

Forestry is the main economic activity in the sector; recreational tourism, second.

The surface of Lake Chézine is usually frozen from the beginning of December to the end of March, however the safe circulation on the ice is generally made from mid-December to mid-March.

Geography 
The main hydrographic slopes near Lake Chézine are:
 North side: Lac Tourilli;
 East side: Chézine North River, Tourilli River, Sainte-Anne River;
 South side: Chézine River, Chézine North River, Sainte-Anne River;
 West side: Nelson River, Leclerc stream.

The Chézine River rises at the mouth of Chézine Lake (altitude ) in the unorganized territory of Lac-Croche . This lake between the mountains is fed by only two mountain streams.

From the mouth of Lake Chézine, the current descends on  towards the south-east following the course of the Chézine River, then on  generally south and southwest following the course of the Sainte-Anne River, to the northwest shore of the St. Lawrence river.

Toponymy 
The toponym "Lac Chézine" was formalized on December 5, 1968, by the Commission de toponymie du Québec.

Notes and references

See also 
 Laurentides Wildlife Reserve
 La Jacques-Cartier Regional County Municipality
 Lac-Croche, an unorganized territory
 Sainte-Anne River (Mauricie)
 Chézine River
 List of lakes in Canada

Lakes of Capitale-Nationale
La Jacques-Cartier Regional County Municipality